is a train station in Unnan, Shimane Prefecture, Japan.

Lines 
West Japan Railway Company
Kisuki Line

Adjacent stations 

Railway stations in Japan opened in 1916
Railway stations in Shimane Prefecture